"La vita nuova" (English: The New Life) is a song by French singer-songwriter and producer Christine and the Queens featuring American recording artist Caroline Polachek, from the EP of the same name. He performed the song on the Global Goal: Unite for Our Future concert on 27 June 2020. On 11 August 2020, Christine announced that a series of remix EPs of the album's title track would be released, with the first and second EPs released on 14 August and 28 August respectively.

Track listing
Remixes, Part 1
"La vita nuova" (A. G. Cook Remix) (featuring Caroline Polachek) – 4:34
"La vita nuova" (Populous Remix) (featuring Caroline Polachek) – 3:51
"La vita nuova" (Logic100 Remix) (featuring Caroline Polachek) – 3:45

Remixes, Part 2
"La vita nuova" (Planningtorock's Queered Version) (featuring Caroline Polachek) – 4:58
"La vita nuova" (Tiger & Woods Remix) (featuring Caroline Polachek) – 5:38
"La vita nuova" (Daniele Baldelli & Marco Dionigo Remix) (featuring Caroline Polachek) – 6:25
"La vita nuova" (Palazo Remix) (featuring Caroline Polachek) – 6:17
"La vita nuova" (A. G. Cook Remix) (featuring Caroline Polachek) – 4:34
"La vita nuova" (Populous Remix) (featuring Caroline Polachek) – 3:51
"La vita nuova" (Logic100 Remix) (featuring Caroline Polachek) – 3:45

Charts

References

2020 singles
2020 songs
Christine and the Queens songs
Caroline Polachek songs
Because Music singles
Songs written by Héloïse Letissier